Arthur Clifford Quisenberry (March 22, 1878 – August 28, 1916) was an American farmer and politician.

Born in Lincoln, Illinois, Quisenberry graduated from Lincoln High School in 1896. He graduated from Lincoln College and from the University of Illinois. Quisenberry was involved in banking, farming, and in live stock. Quisenberry served as treasurer for Logan County, Illinois and was involved with the Democratic Party. Quisenberry served in the Illinois House of Representatives from 1915 until his death. Quisenberry died from cancer of the liver at a hospital in Lincoln, Illinois.

Notes

External links

1878 births
1916 deaths
People from Lincoln, Illinois
Lincoln College (Illinois) alumni
University of Illinois alumni
Businesspeople from Illinois
Farmers from Illinois
County officials in Illinois
Democratic Party members of the Illinois House of Representatives
Deaths from cancer in Illinois
Deaths from liver cancer